Nigel Simmonds is Emeritus Professor of Jurisprudence at the University of Cambridge and former Dean of College at Corpus Christi College, Cambridge.

Career 
Simmonds attended one of the first comprehensive schools in Britain in Cumberland before going to study law at Sidney Sussex College, Cambridge in 1970. He then studied for the LL.M where he once again attained a First Class. After a PhD and some years of teaching at Manchester University, he returned to Cambridge where he was a University Professor in Jurisprudence until his retirement in 2018. At Corpus, Nigel Simmonds was Director of Studies in Law and Dean of College. Nigel Simmonds specialises in Jurisprudence. He is the author of 'A Debate Over Rights' (Oxford, 2000), 'Central Issues in Jurisprudence' (2008) and 'Law as a Moral Idea' (2007).

References

Fellows of Corpus Christi College, Cambridge
Jurisprudence academics
British legal scholars
Living people
Philosophy academics
Philosophers of law
Alumni of Sidney Sussex College, Cambridge
Year of birth missing (living people)